Otopharynx decorus is a species of cichlid endemic to Lake Malawi.  This species can reach a length of  TL.  It can also be found in the aquarium trade.

References

decorus
Fish described in 1935
Taxonomy articles created by Polbot